Goodenia pinnatifida, commonly known as cut-leaf goodenia, scrambled eggs or mother ducks, is a species of flowering plant in the family Goodeniaceae and endemic to Australia. It is a low-lying to ascending perennial herb with toothed to  pinnatisect leaves, racemes of yellow flowers and more or less spherical fruit.

Description
These leaves are toothed to pinnatisect with linear or oblong lobes, but the leaves on the stems, when present, are smaller.

Taxonomy and naming
Goodenia pinnatifida was first formally described in 1848 by Diederich Franz Leonhard von Schlechtendal in the journal Linnaea: ein Journal für die Botanik in ihrem ganzen Umfange, oder Beiträge zur Pflanzenkunde. The specific epithet (pinnatifida) refers to the shape of the leaves.

Distribution and habitat
Cut-leaf goodenia grows in a variety of habitats including grassland, woodland and forest. It occurs in all Australian states and the Australian Capital Territory but not the Northern Territory.

References

pinnatifida
Flora of South Australia
Flora of Western Australia
Flora of Queensland
Flora of New South Wales
Flora of Victoria (Australia)
Flora of the Australian Capital Territory
Flora of Tasmania
Plants described in 1848
Taxa named by Diederich Franz Leonhard von Schlechtendal